Gay G. Kernan (born in 1947 in Oklahoma City, Oklahoma) is an American politician and a Republican member of the New Mexico Senate representing District 42 since her 2002 appointment by Governor of New Mexico Gary Johnson to fill the vacancy caused by the resignation of Senator Shirley Bailey.

Education
Kernan earned her BA from University of Mississippi.

Elections
2012 Kernan was unopposed for both the June 5, 2012 Republican Primary, winning with 2,907 votes and the November 6, 2012 General election, winning with 14,414 votes.
2004 Kernan was challenged in the June 1, 2004 Republican Primary, winning with 1,639 votes (60.1%) and was unopposed for the November 2, 2004 General election, winning with 12,881 votes.
2008 Kernan was unopposed for both the June 8, 2008 Republican Primary, winning with 3,334 votes and the November 4, 2008 General election, winning with 12,519 votes.

References

External links
Official page at the New Mexico Legislature

Gay Kernan at Ballotpedia
Gay Kernan at the National Institute on Money in State Politics

Date of birth missing (living people)
1947 births
Living people
Republican Party New Mexico state senators
Politicians from Oklahoma City
University of Mississippi alumni
Women state legislators in New Mexico
21st-century American politicians
21st-century American women politicians